Chariesthes richteri is a species of beetle in the family Cerambycidae. It was described by Quedenfeldt in 1887. It is known from the Central African Republic, Gabon, the Democratic Republic of the Congo, Cameroon, the Republic of the Congo, and Equatorial Guinea.

References

Chariesthes
Beetles described in 1887